Chris Casto (born December 27, 1991) is an American professional ice hockey defenseman who is currently an unrestricted free agent. He most recently played for the Bridgeport Sound Tigers in the American Hockey League (AHL).

Playing career

Amateur
Casto played three seasons for the Hill-Murray Pioneers in Maplewood, Minnesota.  He played in 3 state tournaments helping the Pioneers to their third state championship in 2008.

In 2010 Casto was drafted 16th overall by the Lincoln Stars of the United States Hockey League and played the 2010–11 season with the team.

For the 2011–12 season Casto moved to the University of Minnesota Duluth Bulldogs for his freshman year.  That year the Bulldogs reached the final of the Northeast region but lost to the eventual Frozen Four champion Boston College Eagles.

Casto remained at UMD for his sophomore season and was named to the WCHA All Academic Team.

Professional
On March 26, 2013, the Boston Bruins announced they had signed Casto to an entry level contract for the 2013–14 season and on March 29, 2013, he signed an amateur tryout contract with the Providence Bruins allowing him to finish the season with the P-Bruins.

For the 2013–14 season Casto began the year at Boston Bruins training camp before being assigned to Providence on September 20, 2013.  Casto played the majority of the season with Providence however he was briefly assigned to the South Carolina Stingrays for one game on December 12, 2013.

Casto again took part in Boston Bruins training camp in September 2014 however was assigned to Providence on September 28, 2014.  He played the remainder of the 2014–15 season with Providence.

The Boston Bruins invited Casto to take part in training camp again in 2015 however he was again reassigned to Providence on September 29, 2015.

After four full seasons in the Bruins organization, Casto left the club as a free agent without breaking through to the NHL. On July 1, 2017, he was signed to a one-year, two-way contract with expansion club, the Vegas Golden Knights.

On September 25, 2018, having been unable to gain NHL interest, Casto signed a one-year AHL deal with the Bridgeport Sound Tigers.

Career statistics

References

External links

1991 births
Living people
American men's ice hockey defensemen
Bridgeport Sound Tigers players
Chicago Wolves players
Ice hockey players from Minnesota
Lincoln Stars players
Minnesota Duluth Bulldogs men's ice hockey players
People from Stillwater, Minnesota
Providence Bruins players
South Carolina Stingrays players